In Love with Barbara is a 2008 drama television film, inspired by the life of the romantic novelist Barbara Cartland, which tells the story of what made her the Queen of Romance. It was written by Jacquetta May and shown on BBC Four at 9:00pm, on Sunday 26 October 2008.

Cast 

 Anne Reid – Barbara Cartland
 David Warner – Lord Mountbatten 
 Sinead Matthews – Young Barbara 
 Tom Burke – Ronald Cartland 
 Rebekah Staton – Helen
 Jacquetta May – Polly Cartland 
 Christopher Naylor – Hugh McCorquodale 
 Elliot Cowan – 'Sacchie' McCorquodale

References

External links 
 

2008 television films
2008 films
2008 romantic drama films
British romantic drama films
Biographical films about writers
Cultural depictions of writers
Cultural depictions of British women
Cultural depictions of Louis Mountbatten, 1st Earl Mountbatten of Burma
2000s English-language films
2000s British films
British drama television films